F108 may refer to:
 CFM International CFM56 turbofan, a US Department of Defense designation
 XF-108 Rapier